Amelia Wildlife Management Area is a  Wildlife Management Area located in Amelia County, Virginia. Much of the land was formerly used for farming; today it is managed to preserve wildlife habitat. Much of the area is bounded on the north by the Appomattox River.

Amelia Wildlife Management Area is owned and maintained by the Virginia Department of Game and Inland Fisheries. The area is open to the public for hunting, fishing, hiking, horseback riding, boating, and camping. Access for persons 17 years of age or older requires a valid hunting or fishing permit, a current Virginia boat registration, or a WMA access permit.

See also
 List of Virginia Wildlife Management Areas

References

External links
Virginia Department of Game and Inland Fisheries: Amelia Wildlife Management Area

Wildlife management areas of Virginia
Protected areas of Amelia County, Virginia